Claudia Porwik, born on 14 November 1968, is a former professional tennis player.

She played on the WTA Tour from 1986 to 1996 and reached the quarterfinals of the Australian Open in 1988 and the semifinals in 1990. Porwik retired with a 195–191 career record, including wins over Gabriela Sabatini and Conchita Martínez.

Fed Cup
Porwik first played for West Germany in the Federation Cup in 1986. She played two singles matches in the Federation Cup, both for Germany in 1990, and won them both. She played her last Fed Cup match in 1995.

WTA career finals

Singles: 1 runner-up

Doubles: 10 (6 titles, 4 runner-ups)

ITF finals

Singles (3–0)

Doubles (1–3)

External links
 
 
 

1968 births
Living people
German female tennis players
People from Coburg
Sportspeople from Upper Franconia
West German female tennis players
Tennis people from Bavaria